Imperator Pavel I ( - Tsar Paul I) was one of two  predreadnought battleships built for the Imperial Russian Navy in the first decade of the 20th century. The ship's construction was greatly delayed by design changes as a result of the Russo-Japanese War and labor unrest after the 1905 Revolution, and she took nearly six years to build. Imperator Pavel I was not very active during World War I and her bored sailors were the first to mutiny in early 1917. The ship was laid up in 1918 and she was scrapped in 1923.

Description
The ship displaced  at deep load. The ship's crew consisted of 31 officers and 924 crewmen.

Twenty-five Belleville boilers provided steam to the engines.

The main armament of the Andrei Pervozvanny class consisted of two pairs of  Model 1895 guns mounted in twin-gun turrets fore and aft of the superstructure. Eight of the fourteen  Model 1905 guns were mounted in four twin-gun turret at the corners of the superstructure while six were mounted in casemates in the superstructure. For defense against torpedo boats, the ships carried twelve  guns mounted in casemates above the 8-inch guns in the superstructure. Two underwater  torpedo tubes were mounted, one on each broadside, and they were provided with six spare torpedoes.

Based on the Russian experience at the Battle of Tsushima, the sides of the ship's hull were completely protected by Krupp cemented armor.

Service history

Imperator Pavel I was built by the Baltic Works in Saint Petersburg. Construction began on 27 October 1904 and was slowed by labor trouble in the shipyard from the 1905 Revolution. She was launched on 7 September 1907 and began her sea trials in October 1910. The ship entered service on 10 March 1911 before her trials were completed in October 1911. Imperator Pavel I joined the Baltic Fleet on completion and she made a port visit to Copenhagen in September 1912. The following September she visited Portland, Cherbourg, and Stavanger. At the beginning of World War I she covered Russian minelaying operations at the entrance of the Gulf of Finland. She did little else for the rest of the war as the Russian naval strategy in the Baltic was defensive; the four  dreadnoughts and the two  predreadnoughts were to defend the entrance to the Gulf of Finland. The ship's lattice masts were cut down in late 1914 and light topmasts were added. Torpedo nets were fitted in early 1915 and the ship's torpedoes were removed in January 1916. In late 1916, four  anti-aircraft guns were added.

Disgruntled sailors aboard Imperator Pavel I instigated the general mutiny of the Baltic Fleet in Helsinki on 16 March 1917, after they received word of the February Revolution in Saint Petersburg, and the ship was renamed Respublika (Republic) on 29 April. The Treaty of Brest-Litovsk required the Soviets to evacuate their naval base at Helsinki in March 1918 or have their ships interned by newly independent Finland even though the Gulf of Finland was still frozen over. Respublika and her sister ship  led the second group of ships on 5 April and reached Kronstadt five days later in what became known as the 'Ice Voyage'. The ship was laid up in October 1918 for lack of manpower and she was scrapped beginning on 22 November 1923. Curiously, Respublika was not formally stricken from the Navy List until 21 November 1925. Two of the 8-inch turrets were installed at the coastal battery No. 9 (later No. 333) near Leningrad (Saint Petersburg) at thirties. Both turrets are scrapped today, but some parts remained inside the concrete shafts.

Notes

Footnotes

References

Further reading

 Melnikov, R. M. (2005, in Russian). Lineyny korabl "Imperator Pavel I" (1906–1925) (Линейный корабль "Император Павел I" (1906–1925)). Samara: ANO Istflot. .

External links
Brief history and photo gallery 
Coastal battery № 9 

Andrei Pervozvanny-class battleships
1907 ships
Ships built at the Baltic Shipyard